Raamatukogu is an Estonian magazine published in Tallinn, Estonia by Estonian Librarians Association and Estonian National Library.

First number was issued in 1923.

1964-1967 it was issued under the name "Huvitavat raamatukogude tööst".

References

External links
About magazine, Estonian Librarians Association's website

Magazines published in Estonia
Library science magazines